Anthony Yoel Ortega Martínez (born August 24, 1985) is a former professional baseball pitcher. He played in Major League Baseball (MLB) for the Los Angeles Angels of Anaheim in 2009.

Professional career
Ortega was signed as an amateur free agent by the Anaheim Angels on October 13, 2003. He made his major league debut on April 25, 2009 against the Seattle Mariners. He took the loss, giving up four runs in five innings of work. He made 3 starts for the Angels in 2009, losing 2 of them with a 9.24 ERA.

Ortega spent the entire 2010 season on the 60-day disabled list and was released on November 17, 2011. He also missed the entire 2012 season after undergoing Tommy John surgery.

On November 16, 2012 the Kansas City Royals signed Ortega to a minor-league contract for the 2013 season. He was released by the Royals in April 2013 and signed a subsequent minor league contract with the Los Angeles Dodgers. He was assigned to the AAA Albuquerque Isotopes.

See also
 List of Major League Baseball players from Venezuela

References

External links

1985 births
Living people
Albuquerque Isotopes players
Arizona League Angels players
Arkansas Travelers players
Bravos de Margarita players
Cedar Rapids Kernels players
Leones de Yucatán players
Los Angeles Angels players
Major League Baseball pitchers
Major League Baseball players from Venezuela
Mexican League baseball pitchers
Orem Owlz players
Rancho Cucamonga Quakes players
Salt Lake Bees players
Tiburones de La Guaira players
Venezuelan expatriate baseball players in Mexico
Venezuelan expatriate baseball players in the United States
Venezuelan expatriate baseball players in San Marino
Venezuelan expatriate baseball players in Panama